The Asian and Oceanian Zone is one of the three zones of regional Davis Cup competition in 2006.

In the Asian and Oceanian Zone there are four different groups in which teams compete against each other to advance to the next group.

Participating teams

Draw

Pakistan relegated to Group II in 2007.
South Korea and Thailand advance to World Group Play-off.

First round matches

South Korea vs. India

Chinese Taipei vs. Pakistan

Japan vs. China

Uzbekistan vs. Thailand

Second round matches

Chinese Taipei vs. South Korea

Thailand vs. Japan

First round play-offs

India vs. Pakistan

Uzbekistan vs. China

Second round play-offs

China vs. Pakistan

References
Draw

Asia Oceania Zone Group I
Davis Cup Asia/Oceania Zone